Margaret E. Winslow (1836-1936) was an American activist, newspaper editor, and author of several temperance books. She served at two separate times, and during the longest period of any editor-in-chief of Our Union, the national organ of the Woman's Christian Temperance Union (WCTU). It was a burst of inspiration from Winslow, relative to its simplicity and purity, which at the National WCTU Convention in Chicago determined the union to wear the white ribbon as a badge rather than the red, white, and blue which was strongly urged by many.

Early years and education
Margaret Elizabeth Winslow was born in New York City, in 1836. She was of Puritan antecedents, and spent most of her life in Brooklyn, and Saugerties on the Hudson River. Winslow signed the pledge and wrote temperance compositions when but eight years old. At fifteen, she declined to come into the parlor on New Year's Day if wine was offered, and carried her point. She was educated partly at the Abbot Institution in New York, and partly at Packer Collegiate Institute, of which she was a graduate.

Career

Teacher
For twelve years, Winslow taught at Packer Institute. The last year of her stay, she held the position of composition teacher, and had charge of the Art Department of Pictures, Coins, and so forth. At the age of nineteen, she united with the Episcopal church, of which she remained a loyal member. She spent 1869–70 in Europe studying and traveling in England, France, Italy, and Germany. She became acquainted with many foreign Protestants, and on coming home was made one of Albert Woodruffs "Foreign Sunday School Association" (Italian Committee).

Activist
The Women's Crusade (1873–74) in Ohio roused her interest and enthusiasm. Dr. Diocletian Lewis came to Brooklyn fresh from the great awakening in Ohio. The Packer Institute teacher attended several temperance prayer-meetings, and was present at the one (March 17, 1874) at which the first Brooklyn WCTU was organized. Desiring to attend the daily meetings which followed, she persuaded the editor of the New York Witness to accept reports, and every day for fourteen weeks, went directly from school to the YMCA in Brooklyn, where these meetings were held. Here was uttered her first public testimony for Christ. One evening, Winslow went with fifteen women to a prayer meeting in a liquor saloon. In a letter to one of her friends she thus graphically describes the scene:—

From that time, Winslow spoke at temperance gatherings, missions, prisons, and other places, in Brooklyn and elsewhere. She also took part in Dwight L. Moody's work in Brooklyn, and later in New York. Later on, she went to Florida. In 1877, at the National WCTU Convention in Farwell Hall, Chicago, there was much controversy as to what should be the badge of the WCTU. Some advocated royal purple, and some the red, white and blue. The committee first recommended a badge of royal purple and violet; this was amended to a bow of white ribbon with a cross of red and an anchor of blue combined, woven in the fabric and stamped with the initials, “W. C. T. U.” Winslow rose at the crisis of the debate and made an inspired speech on the superior symbolic meaning of the white ribbon as the badge. She moved to substitute a bow of white ribbon with “W. C. T. U.” in gold letters. After much discussion, this was finally adopted by the convention.

Editor, writer
Winslow attended the National WCTU Convention held in Newark, 1876, where she was chosen editor of Our Union. She declined re-appointment to the position for a principle— because she objected to the Home Protection movement. Becoming somewhat less conservative, she accepted this position again in 1880, and retained it until the paper was united with The Union Signal in 1883.

In 1880, Winslow began writing for the press, her works appearing in the New York Observer, New York Evangelist, Independent, Christian Union, Churchman, Christian at Work, Christian Advocate, Christian Register, Sunday School Times, and St. Nicholas. She was the author of five or six story books, published by the National Temperance Society, American Sunday School Union, and others. She also wrote poetry, and lyrics to hymns, including "Intercede for Us", "Waiting for Thy Coming", and "We Shall Know Each Other There".

She died in 1936.

Selected works
Life Among the Red Men
A More Excellent Way; and Other Incidents in the Women's Gospel Temperance Movement in America, 1878
Save the Boys, 1883
Katie Robertson (New York: A. L. Burt, 1885)
Three Years at Glenwood, 1885
Sketch of the Life, Character and Work of Alonzo Crittenden, 1885
Under Ban (New York: National Temperance Society and Publication House, 1885)
The Sewells or To Every Man His Work (Congregational Sunday-School and Publishing society, 1887)  
Miss Malcolm's Ten, 1892
The Secret of Victory
Saved
Barford Mills
Michael Ellis’ Text
Saved from the Street
West Beach Boys
Three Girls in Italy
Marion's Temptation

References

Bibliography

External links
 

1836 births
1936 deaths
Writers from New York City
Woman's Christian Temperance Union people
19th-century American newspaper editors
19th-century American non-fiction writers
American temperance activists
19th-century American women writers
American women non-fiction writers
Women newspaper editors